Loga is a department of the Dosso Region in Niger. Its capital lies at the city of Loga. 
As of 2011, the department had a total population of 184,843 people.

References

Departments of Niger
Dosso Region